Horribates bantai is a species of windscorpion in the family Eremobatidae.

References

Further reading

 
 
 
 
 
 

Solifugae
Articles created by Qbugbot
Animals described in 1989